Chitral Airport  is a small domestic airport situated 2 NM (3.7 km) north of the city centre of Chitral, in the Khyber-Pakhtunkhwa province of Pakistan.

Airlines and destinations

See also 
 List of airports in Pakistan

References

External links
 

Airports in Khyber Pakhtunkhwa
Chitral